The Foch Line was a temporary demarcation line between Poland and Lithuania proposed by the Entente in the aftermath of World War I. The line was proposed by Marshal of France Ferdinand Foch, which was discussed only with Polish side, was accepted by the Conference of Ambassadors in 1919. After the Polish–Lithuanian War, with small adjustments the line formed the basis of the inter-war Polish-Lithuanian border. 
The line left Vilnius on the Polish side. After World War II only its westernmost part, close to the town of Suwałki, follows the line.

References

Bibliography

See also 
 Curzon Line
 Polish-Lithuanian War
 Suwałki Agreement
 Sejny Uprising

1919 in Lithuania
Lithuania–Poland border
1919 in Poland
Lithuania–Poland relations
Eponymous border lines